Kuttervirus is a genus of bacteriophages in the family Ackermannviridae. The genus contains 40 species.

Characterization 

The heads of these phages are icosahedral in nature. Their tails are composed of a collared neck (similar in structure to that of a T4 phage), “a sheath surrounding a tail tube or core, a thin base plate, and an adsorption structure”  Notably, a series of unique protrusions can be found stemming from the base plate of these organisms. 3 to 4 thick, rounded prongs (located at the bottom of the base plate) and an equal number of thinner, star-like protrusions (attached to the sides of the baseplate via a stalk) have been observed in members of the genus.

Members of the genus are similar in terms of genomics. All species in the genus showed above a 75% commonality in protein composition.  While “the gene order is strongly conserved in all seven phages…various functional regions are randomly distributed throughout the genome…”. Functional clustering, as observed in other genera of phages, is uniquely absent from Kuttervirus, and proves to be a defining quality of the genus.

Due to the diversity in tail-spike filaments, researchers have suggested that these phages may be capable of infecting a wider range of hosts.  One such example has already been observed: the species SFP10 has successfully infected of the genus Salmonella and of the species E. coli. While all members of the genus possess tail spikes, it is important to note that each species may possess unique spikes, many of which must be further researched to determine their function.

Taxonomy
The genus contains the following species:

Escherichia virus CBA120
Escherichia virus ECML4
Escherichia virus EP75
Escherichia virus FEC14
Escherichia virus PhaxI
Salmonella virus 38
Salmonella virus aagejoakim
Salmonella virus allotria
Salmonella virus barely
Salmonella virus bering
Salmonella virus BSP101
Salmonella virus Det7
Salmonella virus dinky
Salmonella virus GG32
Salmonella virus heyday
Salmonella virus maane
Salmonella virus Marshall
Salmonella virus Maynard
Salmonella virus moki
Salmonella virus Mutine
Salmonella virus pertopsoe
Salmonella virus PM10
Salmonella virus rabagast
Salmonella virus S118
Salmonella virus SE14
Salmonella virus SeB
Salmonella virus SeG
Salmonella virus SeJ
Salmonella virus SenALZ1
Salmonella virus SenASZ3
Salmonella virus SeSz1
Salmonella virus SFP10
Salmonella virus SH19
Salmonella virus SJ2
Salmonella virus SJ3
Salmonella virus SP1
Salmonella virus SS9
Salmonella virus STML131
Salmonella virus STW77
Salmonella virus ViI

References 

Ackermannviridae
Virus genera